The Policía Municipal de Ponce (English: Ponce Municipal Police) is the main police force for the municipality of Ponce, Puerto Rico, with jurisdiction in the entire municipality, including all 31 barrios of Ponce. It was created in 1867 and reorganized in 1977.

History
The history of the Ponce Municipal Police dates back to at least 1867, having not only an armed police force but also a complete set of bylaws specifying its organization and ranks, equipment (including uniform and firearms), service standards and code of conduct, procedures and reporting, training, pay and benefits, and duty and accountability. It is clear from the 1867 municipal police reorganization that, even prior to 1867, there was already a police force in place as the reorganization also makes reference to absorbing "the existing corps in place on the date of this reorganization". It had its headquarters on the first floor of Casa Ayuntamiento.

In 1895 Ponce mayor Juan José Potous issued an "Informe de Necesidades" (Needs Report) where he listed the following regarding his objectives in reference to the "Cuerpo de Policia Municipal" (Municipal Police Corps):

 Improve the Municipal Police Corps to where it can provide complete and efficient security in the City and its rural barrios at all hours
 Place a sergeant in Barrio Playa on a permanent basis
 Establish the position of barrio police deputy, providing a stipend for expenses such that such service will not be a burden   
 Set up a budget for confidential and ancillary police expenses.

Observations about the Ponce municipal police reveal that, in 1901, the Puerto Rico Federal Party, of which Luis Muñoz Rivera was its leader, considered the Ponce municipal police chief, Rodulfo Figueroa, "a highly controversial figure" for his association with "dangerous" elements of the lower class. Nevertheless, the association was later regarded as a way of developing strong ties with both upper and lower classes of society.

The report from the Military Governor of Puerto Rico in 1902 also makes reference to the municipal police force in the city of Ponce. At the time (1902), it was the only police force serving the municipality of Ponce. The Municipal Police was established by order of the Municipal Assembly, via Municipal Orders Number 104 and 136, and made effective as of 9 May 1903.

The Municipal Police was reorganized in 1977, when Law #19 of 12 May 1977, known as Ley de la Guardia Municipal (Municipal Guard Law) significantly increased its powers and duties. Since its re-establishment in September 1977, the Ponce Municipal Police has been growing in personnel and equipment. It is the second city police force in Puerto Rico to have an Amber Alert Task Force.

Location
The Ponce Municipal Police headquarters are located on Avenida Las Américas and Carretera Pámpanos in barrio Canas at the Secretaría de Recreación y Deportes building. A new building, which used to be occupied by the Ponce regional headquarters of the Puerto Rico Police on Avenida Hostos in Barrio Canas Urbano, is currently under refurbishment to become the new headquarters of the Ponce Municipal Police. This second location currently still houses the control center of the Ponce Municipal Police which monitors the city's 334 security cameras.  As of April 2012, the administrative offices of the Police Commissioner are located on the third floor of the Secretaria de Deportes on Avenida Las Américas, in barrio Canas. At one point there were also plans to headquarter the Ponce Municipal Police at the former Plaza del Mercado de Ponce, known as Edificio Bigas, once it was reconfigured, but the site may be used to headquarter only a precinct.

Precincts
By 1992, Policía Municipal had spread to six precincts, namely, Playa (Barrio Playa), Bélgica (Barrio Cuarto), Barrio Coto Laurel, Glenview (Barrio Machuelo Arriba), Mariani (Barrio Canas Urbano), and Molina at Calle Vives (Barrio Segundo).

Today (2018), Municipal Police precincts can also be found at La Guancha, Mariani (Fullana), Bélgica, and Cantera. There is also a tourist police precinct on the first underground level of the municipal parking garage at the Dora Colón Clavell Urban Park.  The Transit Unit works out of the Mariani precinct, while the Maritime Unit works out of the La Guancha precinct.

The location of the units is as follows:

 Athletic League, Division of Internal Affairs, and the Office of the Municipal Police Commissioner - Third floor of the Secretaría de Recreación on Avenida Las Americas
 Transit and Community Units - Mariani (also known as the Fullana precinct)
 Digital Command Center - Former headquarters of the Puerto Rico Police on Avenida Hostos
 Motorized and Rapid Response Units - Bélgica
 Tourism and School Units - Parque Urbano Dora Colón Clavell
 Bicycle Unit - Cantera precinct
 Maritime Unit - La Guancha
 Prevention and Domestic Violence Units - Puerto Rico Police Headquarters at Urb. Los Caobos
There is also a canine unit.

Upon Puerto Rico Police for the Ponce region vacating its headquarters at the intersection of Avenida Hostos (PR-123) and Avenida Las Americas (PR-163) at the end of 2010, Ponce Mayor Mayita Meléndez announced plans in May 2011 to invest $2.4 million for the remodeling of such facilities to serve as the first consolidated headquarters of the Ponce Municipal Police.

Authority
Until recently the Ponce Municipal Police had limited powers to make arrests and carry other such police activities without coordinating with the Puerto Rico Police. This changed on 29 July 2010, when Puerto Rico governor Luis Fortuño Burset signed various orders that increased the powers of the municipal police force, including making certain types of arrests without consulting with the Puerto Rico Police. The issuance of traffic violation summonses, which had traditionally been handled by the Transit Division of the Puerto Rico Police, is also an activity that according to law may be performed by the Municipal Police as well.

Amendments made to the Puerto Rico Municipal Police Code allows them to operate as if they were agents of the Puerto Rico Police.

Commissioners

Following are the commissioners of the Ponce Municipal Police since the force was created in 1977.

 1977-1985: Coronel Pedro Rodríguez Seguín
 1985-1987: Roberto Duque Santos
 1987-1989: Norberto Rodríguez Alicea
 1989-1995: Carlos Rodríguez
 1995-1996: Eduardo Díaz Caraballo
 1996-2004: Gilberto Colón Rodríguez
 2004-2008: Alfredo Lugo Vera
 2009-2010: Francisco Quiñones Rivera
 2010-2014: Inspector Norberto Rodríguez Alicea
 2014-2015: Lieutenant Elvin Pacheco Vélez (interim)
 2015-2018: Inspector Angel Alvarez Boneta
 2018-2020(?): Juan Gerardo Molina Perez
 2021(?) - Incumbent: Pedro Quiles

See also

 Puerto Rico Police - Ponce Area

Notes

References

Further reading
 Fay Fowlie de Flores. Ponce, Perla del Sur: Una Bibliográfica Anotada. Second Edition. 1997. Ponce, Puerto Rico: Universidad de Puerto Rico en Ponce. p. 319. Item 1600. 
 Reglamento para el cuerpo de la policía municipal de Ponce, tal como resulta de las ordenanzas números 104 y 136 del Consejo Municipal de dicha ciudad, aprobada por el alcalde [Antonio Arias (José Lloréns Echevarría, secretario)] en 9 de mayo de 1903. Ponce, Puerto Rico: Tipografía Baldorioty, 1903. (Universidad de Puerto Rico, Rio Piedras) 
 Fay Fowlie de Flores. Ponce, Perla del Sur: Una Bibliográfica Anotada. Second Edition. 1997. Ponce, Puerto Rico: Universidad de Puerto Rico en Ponce. p. 26. Item 126. 
 "Edificios públicos de Ponce." Puerto Rico Ilustrado. 5 November 1938. p. 30. (Colegio Universitario Tecnológico de Ponce) 
 Fay Fowlie de Flores. Ponce, Perla del Sur: Una Bibliografía Anotada. Second Edition. 1997. Ponce, Puerto Rico: Universidad de Puerto Rico en Ponce. p. 334. Item 1666. 
 Ponce. ''Ordenanzas de policía urbana urbana y rural para la ciudad de Ponce y su termino municipal; aprobadas por el Excmo. Sr. Gobernador General en 24 de febrero de 1888. 2. ed. Ponce, Puerto Rico: Imprenta de Manuel Lopez, 1904. (Universidad de Puerto Rico, Rio Piedras)

Municipal police departments of Puerto Rico
1977 establishments in Puerto Rico
Government of Ponce, Puerto Rico